The Church of San Vicente Mártir is a church located in Vitoria-Gasteiz, Basque Country, Spain. It was declared Bien de Interés Cultural in 1984.

The church is named after Saint Vincent of Saragossa, a 4th century martyr. The church was built in the late 15th and early 16th centuries. The current tower, of Neo-Byzantine style, was finished in 1872.

References

External links
 

15th-century Roman Catholic church buildings in Spain
16th-century Roman Catholic church buildings in Spain
Bien de Interés Cultural landmarks in Álava
Buildings and structures in Vitoria-Gasteiz
Byzantine Revival architecture in Spain
Churches in Álava
Gothic architecture in the Basque Country (autonomous community)